The Jorvik Viking Centre is a museum and visitor attraction in York, England, containing lifelike mannequins and life-size dioramas depicting Viking life in the city. Visitors are taken through the dioramas in small carriages equipped with speakers. It was created by the York Archaeological Trust and opened in 1984. Its name is derived from Jórvík, the Old Norse name for York and the surrounding Viking Kingdom of Yorkshire.

Background 

In the 1850s confectioner Thomas Craven acquired a site in Coppergate. When he died in 1862 his widow Mary Ann Craven continued the business and a century later, in 1966, Cravens relocated to a new factory on the outskirts of the city. Between 1976 and 1981, after the old factory was demolished, and prior to the building of the Coppergate Shopping Centre (an open-air pedestrian shopping centre which now occupies the enlarged site), the York Archaeological Trust, a charity founded in 1972 by Peter Addyman, conducted extensive excavations in the area. Well-preserved remains of some of the timber buildings of the Viking city of Jorvík were discovered, along with workshops, fences, animal pens, privies, pits and wells, together with durable materials and artefacts of the time, such as pottery, metalwork and bones. Unusually, wood, leather, textiles, and plant and animal remains from the period around 900 AD, were also discovered to be preserved in oxygen-deprived wet clay. In all, over 40,000 objects were recovered.

The trust recreated the excavated part of Jorvik on the site, peopled with figures, sounds and smells, as well as pigsties, fish market and latrines, with a view to bringing the Viking city fully to life using innovative interpretative methods. The Jorvik Viking Centre, which was designed by John Sunderland, opened in April 1984. Since its formation, the centre has had close to 20 million visitors.

Today 

In 2001, the centre was refurbished and enlarged at a cost of £5 million, and a further investment of £1 million followed in February 2010. These investments were used to "intensify the message" at Jorvik, and included such changes as extending the ride time to 12 minutes, as well as adding more high-tech elements, which included a hike in "the technology and animation elements," and increasing "the sensory stimuli to include smells, more sounds, heat, cold and damp." Visitors are taken back to 5:30 pm 25 October 975 AD in a time-capsule, and then embark on a tour of a reconstructed Viking settlement which includes voices speaking in Old Norse, as well as aromas and "life-like animated figures, made by laser technology from skeletons found on the site." Beyond this is an extensive museum area, which combines an exhibition of some 800 finds from the site with interactive displays and the opportunity to learn about tenth-century life and to discuss it with "Viking" staff. Among the exhibits is a replica of the Coppergate Helmet, which was found near the site of the centre and is now in the Yorkshire Museum. The third incarnation of Jorvik was opened on 13 February 2010, coinciding with the start of the annual Viking Festival in York. The attraction was completely rebuilt following devastating flooding in December 2015, re-opening on 8 April 2017 with the Return of the Vikings.

Jorvik Viking models
Graham Ibbeson created the lifelike mannequins used in the Jorvik experience. At first the faces of these mannequins were modelled from modern day people. However, through advances in facial reconstruction technology eight new mannequins have now been modelled on skulls found in a Viking age cemetery, although there is no guarantee that the skulls were Norse, and there is the possibility that they were Saxon.

Viking Festival 
The centre also organizes an annual Viking Festival that takes place in the second week of February. The festival is set up in tradition of an ancient Viking festival known as "Jolablot". The festival includes Combat re-enactment involving volunteers from all over the world.

"Time Warp" experience 
Jorvik Viking Centre is not billed as a museum but as an "experience"; this type of educational representation of the past, known as a "Time Warp" experience, has become increasingly popular with the creation of Jorvik. It inspired other such sites as the "Canterbury Pilgrims Way" where visitors could join Geoffrey Chaucer's pilgrimage.

2015 flood damage 
The centre was significantly affected by the flooding in Northern England in December 2015 with extensive water damage to the building and exhibits. The most valuable Viking artefacts were moved to prevent damage. The museum reopened on 8 April 2017. As part of the redisplay, a new figure of an 'Arab' was introduced to the experience.

Public response 
The Jorvik Viking Centre has been called "one of Britain's most popular attractions." The BBC spoke of the "Time Warp" experience as "a new art form".

The Jorvik Centre has been criticized as a "pop-up book view of history" and its presentation of the past has been labelled "Disney-like". Anthony Gaynor, one of the creators of the centre, responded by stating: "We're making history accessible and enjoyable to the general public. You can't do that if you wrap it in a lot of academic foliage."

See also
 The Lloyds Bank coprolite is exhibited there.

Notes

References

Further reading

External links 

Anglo-Norse England
Archaeological sites in North Yorkshire
Archaeological museums in England
Museums in York
Viking Age museums
Living museums in England
Museums established in 1984
1984 establishments in England
York Archaeological Trust
Coppergate